From Hank, Bruce, Brian and John is the seventh rock album by British instrumental (and sometimes vocal) group The Shadows, released in 1967. It was their last album to be issued in mono and stereo.

Track listing

Personnel
 Hank Marvin – Lead guitar and vocals
 Bruce Welch – Rhythm guitar and vocals
 John Rostill – Bass guitar and vocals
 Brian Bennett – Drums and percussion
 Alan Hawkshaw - Organ
 Olivia Newton-John - Guest vocals on "The Day I Met Marie"
 Norrie Paramor - Producer
 Peter Vince - Engineer

References 

1967 albums
EMI Columbia Records albums
The Shadows albums
Albums produced by Norrie Paramor